Tafiti was an animated search engine launched by Microsoft Corp. and TrappsInteractive to showcase the Silverlight animation and video player. 

It was launched in 2007 and was discontinued in 2009.

Overview
The name Tafiti comes from the Swahili word meaning to "do research". The Tafiti search engine was a project driven by the Platform Incubation team in Microsoft as an effort to promote next generation search concepts and technologies such as Silverlight and the Live Search API.

Tafiti incorporated visuals with common web searches. Searches were presented, through a graphic interface, with results appearing in a central column. Via a carousel on the left hand side, users could select the type of media to search in Websites, news feeds, books, or images. Results could be dragged and saved on a "shelf" on the right hand side. These results could then be e-mailed or added to a blog. Tafiti also offered a "tree view," with search results displayed as branches.

On the Tafiti Website, Microsoft said the service was designed to "Help people use the web for research projects that span multiple search queries and sessions by helping visualize, store, and share research results." The service was intended to "explore the intersection of richer experiences on the web and the increasing specialization of search."

Tafiti was discontinued in 2009 with the release of Microsoft Bing. Source code was released in July 2008 on CodePlex as part of the Windows Live Quick Apps project.

References 
CBC, Microsoft launches animated search engine. Retrieved on August 23, 2007.
IT Week Labs, Microsoft’s Tafiti looks interesting but immature. Retrieved on August 23, 2007.

External links 
Tafiti Project at Codeplex

Discontinued Microsoft software
Defunct internet search engines